Sebastiano Caracciolo (1922–2013) was an important Mason and Martinist. He served as a member of the administration of the Masonic order Le Droit Humain in Italy, but later devoted himself to the Misraim - Memphis Rite. In 1981 he became the Sovereign Grand General Hierophant of the Ancient and Primitive Oriental Rite of Misraim and Memphis succeeding Gastone Ventura.

Caracciolo also served in the post of Sovereign Grand Master of the Martinist Order in Italy. He was the author of the following works: The Hermetic Tradition in Free-Masonry, Women's Initiation, and contributed articles in the Initiatic Awakening of the Ancient and Primitive Oriental Rite of Misraim and Memphis and in The Hermit of the Italian Martinist Order.

Italian Freemasons
1922 births
2013 deaths